Pseudorhaphitoma scitula is a small sea snail, a marine gastropod mollusk in the family Mangeliidae.

Description
The length of the shell attains 6.7 mm, its diameter 2.2 mm.

This abundant little white species, has a fusiform shape narrowed below, with swollen upper whorls, and coarse spiral lirae, hexagonal, with very beautiful spiral, minutely punctate striae between the lirations just mentioned. The aperture is rather small, proportionately speaking

Distribution
This marine species occurs in the Persian Gulf and the Gulf of Oman.

References

 R.N. Kilburn, Turridae (Mollusca: Gastropoda) of southern Africa and Mozambique. Part 7. Subfamily Mangeliinae, section 2; Annals of the Natal Museum 34, pp 317 - 367 (1993)

External links
 
 

scitula
Gastropods described in 1884